Alphonse Dante Bichette Jr. (born September 26, 1992) is an American former baseball third baseman and first baseman. He was drafted by the New York Yankees in the first round of the 2011 Major League Baseball draft.

Early life and career

Bichette was born in Orlando, Florida, in 1992. His father Dante Bichette, is a former Major League Baseball player. His brother, Bo, plays for the Toronto Blue Jays.

Bichette played in the 2005 Little League World Series. During his senior year at Orangewood Christian High School, he batted .640 with 10 home runs and 40 RBIs in 30 games.

Professional career

New York Yankees
Bichette was drafted 51st overall in the 2011 Major League Baseball draft by the New York Yankees. He debuted in the Minor Leagues as part of the Yankees Gulf Coast League team, the GCL Yankees on June 20, 2011.

Colorado Rockies
Bichette became a free agent after the 2017 season, and signed a minor league contract with the Colorado Rockies on December 23. He was released on March 28, 2018.

St. Paul Saints
On April 2, 2018, Bichette signed with the St. Paul Saints of the American Association.

High Point Rockers
On February 21, 2019, Bichette was traded to the High Point Rockers of the Atlantic League of Professional Baseball.

Washington Nationals
He was named Atlantic League Player of the Month for April and May, appearing in 36 games before his rights were purchased and he was signed to a minor league deal by the Washington Nationals. He became a free agent following the 2019 season. On December 26, 2019, Bichette re-signed with the Nationals on a minor league contract. Bichette was released by the Nationals on May 31, 2020.

International career
Bichette represented Brazil in the 2017 World Baseball Classic. Both Bichette and his brother Bo Bichette have played for Brazil in the WBC due to their mother Mariana being a native of Porto Alegre, Brazil. Their maternal grandfather is of Chinese descent.

Personal life
Bichette’s father, Dante, is a former Major League Baseball player and four-time All-Star. His younger brother, Bo, currently plays with the Toronto Blue Jays.

References

External links

Dante Bichette, Jr. Stats, Bio, Photos, Highlights

1992 births
Living people
American sportspeople of Brazilian descent
American sportspeople of Chinese descent
Baseball players from Orlando, Florida
Baseball first basemen
Baseball second basemen
Baseball third basemen
Charleston RiverDogs players
Gulf Coast Yankees players
Harrisburg Senators players
High Point Rockers players
Scottsdale Scorpions players
St. Paul Saints players
Staten Island Yankees players
Tampa Yankees players
Trenton Thunder players